Choi Kyung-ah (born 20 September 1969) is a South Korean manhwa artist. Her popular series Snow Drop is a story about star-crossed teenagers So-na and Hae-gi who fall madly in love. She is married and has a son.

Works 
 Snow Drop (1999) 
 Bibi (2001)
 Crazy Coffie Cat (written by her husband  Uhm Re-Kyeong)
 Love Nawara Dundan! (1999)
 Myeongtaeja Dyeon (2003)
 Ruby Doll (2006)
 Ice Kiss (2006)
 Dreaming Lilac (2008)

References 

1969 births
South Korean manhwa artists
South Korean manhwa writers
Living people
South Korean female comics artists
South Korean women artists
Female comics writers